Ceratozamia fuscoviridis is a species of plant in the family Zamiaceae. It is endemic to Hidalgo state in Mexico. It is a Critically endangered species, threatened by habitat loss.

References

Osborne R, Stevenson DWM, Vovides AP What is Ceratozamia fuscoviridis ? Delpinoa 2006; 48: 5-10

fuscoviridis
Endemic flora of Mexico
Flora of Hidalgo (state)
Critically endangered plants
Critically endangered biota of Mexico
Taxonomy articles created by Polbot